Park Jeong-in is a South Korean football forward who plays for Busan IPark.

Career statistics

Club

References

2000 births
Living people
Association football forwards
South Korean footballers
Ulsan Hyundai FC players
K League 1 players